John or Johnny Byrne may refer to:

Arts and entertainment 
John Byrne (English artist) (1786–1847), English painter and printmaker
Johnny Byrne (writer) (1935–2008), former BBC editor and script writer
John Byrne (playwright) (born 1940), Scottish playwright and artist
John Byrne (musician) (1946–2008), Irish-born American musician
John Byrne (comics) (born 1950), American comic book artist and writer
John Byrne (columnist), British writer and broadcaster
John Byrne (Irish artist), Irish performance and multimedia artist

Politics
 John Byrne (Irish politician) (1878–1942), Irish Cumann na nGaedhael politician
 John F. Byrne Sr. (1911–1965), American politician, member of Philadelphia City Council
 John F. Byrne Jr. (born 1935), American politician, member of the Pennsylvania State Senate, son of the above

Sports
John Byrne (Scottish footballer) (born 1939), Scottish footballer
Johnny Byrne (footballer) (1939–1999), England international footballer, soccer coach in South Africa
John Byrne (footballer, born 1949), English footballer for Tranmere Rovers
John Byrne (Australian footballer) (born 1956), Australian rules footballer for North Melbourne
John Byrne (footballer, born 1961), English-born footballer for QPR, Sunderland and the Republic of Ireland
John Byrne (footballer, born 1962), Irish footballer
John Byrne (cricketer) (born 1972), Irish cricketer

Others 
 John Byrne (VC) (1832–1879), Irish recipient of the Victoria Cross
 John Edgar Byrne (1842–1906), Australian journalist and newspaper proprietor
 John Francis Byrne, creator of the Chaocipher
 Jock Byrne (John Thomas Byrne, 1903–1969), Scottish trade unionist and anti-communist
 John Byrne (businessman) (1919–2013), Irish property developer
 John V. Byrne (born 1928), American marine geologist and academic
 John J. Byrne (1931–2013), American insurance industry executive
 John Byrne (computer scientist) (1933–2016), Irish computer scienctist
 John Byrne (judge) (born 1948), Senior Judge Administrator of the Supreme Court of Queensland
 John K. Byrne (born 1981), founder of the Raw Story news website
 John Byrne (telescope maker), American telescope maker
 John H. Byrne, American neuroscientist

See also 
Jack Byrne (disambiguation)
John Burn (disambiguation)
Jon Byrne (born 1983), Australian-born baseball umpire
John W. Byrnes (1913–1985), U.S. Representative from Wisconsin
Byrne